Khondoler misti is a sweet originating in the Khandal of Feni district, Bangladesh. This sweet is famous and very popular in the Feni area. It is  a variation of roshogolla.  The specialty of this sweet is that while all other sweets of Bangladesh are consumed at cold or normal temperature, Khondoler misti is consumed hot along with normal temperature.

Ingredients
Chhana
Flour
Oil, for frying
Sugar syrup

References

Bangladeshi desserts
Feni District